Diakhao (Serer proper : Jaxaaw) is a commune in the Fatick Region in the west of Senegal.

History

Diakhao was the last capital of the pre-colonial Serer  Kingdom of Sine.  It has several sites classified as historical monuments. It houses the tombs of the Serer kings such as Maad a Sinig Kumba Ndoffene Famak Joof (king of Sine), the tombs of the Guelowars, the Lingeers and the Kanger (or Kangeer) baobab, a place of libation of the kings of Sine (Maad a Sinig).

In 1867 at the Surprise of Mbin o Ngor (a surprise attack against the Serers by the Muslim marabout which precipitated the Battle of Fandane-Thiouthioune), Diakhao was burned to the ground by the marabouts. To rebuild his capital (Diakhao), Maad a Sinig Kumba Ndoffene Famak implemented new tax measures throughout the Sine. Although Maad a Sinig Kumba Ndoffene Famak had no problem collecting taxes in other areas of Sine, he failed in Joal, one of the principalities of Sine occupied by the French administration.  For years he tried to exercise his authority in Joal. In August 1871, he went to Joal to deal with the French and exercise his authority in the area. He was assassinated.

Administration
Diakhao is a rural commune in the Department of Fatick (in Fatick Region).

Geography
The closest localities are Soror, Gadoguene, Ndidor, Tela, Maronem, Ngekor, Ndofene, Ndofane and Ndielem Farha.

Population
Diakhao, which is inhabited by the Serer people is one of the Serer countries.  According to PEPAM (Programme d'eau potable et d'assainissement du Millénaire), the estimated population is 3429.

See also
Serer ancient history
Index of Serer royalty

References

External links
 Maps, weather and airports for Diakhao
 Diakhao sur le site PEPAM (Programme d'eau potable et d'assainissement du Millénaire)
 RÉPUBLIQUE DU SÉNÉGAL

Populated places in Fatick Region
Communes of Senegal